Solo Balapan Station (also known as Balapan Station, station code SLO), is a major railway station in Surakarta, Central Java, Indonesia. The name "Balapan" is taken from the name of a village which is located to the north of the station. The station is located on the railway line that connects the cities of Bandung, Jakarta, Surabaya, and Semarang. Solo Balapan Station is the largest station in Surakarta and Central Java.

Services
The following is a list of train services at the Solo Balapan Station.

Intercity trains

Executive Class 
 Argo Wilis, to  via - and to  via -
 Argo Lawu, to and from  via --
 Argo Dwipangga, to and from  via --
 Gajayana, to  via -- and to  via -
Bima, to  via -- and to  via -
 Turangga, to  via - and to  via -

Mixed Class 
 Fajar/Senja Utama Solo, to and from  via -- (executive class and premium economy class)
 Lodaya, to and from  via - (executive class and premium economy class)
 Sancaka, to  and to  via - (executive class and premium economy class)
 Bangunkarta, to  via -- and to  via  (executive class and economy plus class)
 Malabar, to  via - and to  via - (executive class, business class, and economy plus class)
 Mutiara Selatan, to  via - and to  via - (executive class and premium economy class)
 Kertanegara, to  via  and to  via - (executive class and economy plus class)
 Malioboro Ekspres, to  and to  via - (executive class and economy plus class)
 Ranggajati, to  via - and to  via -- (executive class and business class)
 Wijayakusuma, to  via  and to  via  (executive class and premium economy class)
 Sancaka Utara, to  and to  (executive class and business class)

Premium Economy Class 
 Jayakarta Premium, to  via - and to  via

Economy Plus Class 
 Joglosemarkerto, loop line through Central Java and the Special Region of Yogyakarta via  and

Commuter rail 

Bus connection 

The Balapan bus stops of Batik Solo Trans is located near Solo Balapan Station, serving Corridor 2 and 6. 

To the east of the station is a skybridge that directly connects the station with Tirtonadi Bus Terminal, making it easier for train passengers to continue their journey by bus or vice versa. Tirtonadi Bus Terminal is currently serving intercity buses to destinations across Java and Sumatra, as well as Corridors 4, 7FS, and 11FS of Batik Solo Trans and Corridor S1 of Trans Jateng BRT.

In popular culture
The station became an inspiration for one of the most popular campursari songs in the 1990s from Didi Kempot Setasiun Balapan. For his work on about the station, PT Kereta Api Indonesia officially appointed Didi Kempot as a "railway ambassador" after the Indo pop music group ST 12.

References

External links

Buildings and structures in Surakarta
Railway stations in Central Java